Old Main is a term often applied to the original building present on college or university campuses in the United States. The building serves today as home to administrative offices, such as the president or provost, but in its early inception may have served multiple functions, including classrooms and residences.  Although many university campuses have outgrown the initial capacity of "old mains" and their geography has made them less central to university life than they once were, the building is commonly depicted in university or college marketing material to promote the longevity and tradition of the institution. Many old main buildings are surmounted by large towers, cupolas, or spires, occasionally housing bells or carillons. Some examples of "old mains" (sorted by U.S. state):

Arizona
 
 Old Main (Arizona State University), the first building on the campus of Arizona State University in Tempe, Arizona
 Old Main, University of Arizona, the first building on the campus of the University of Arizona in Tucson, Arizona

Arkansas

 Old Main (University of Arkansas), the first building on the campus of the University of Arkansas in Fayetteville, Arkansas

Colorado

Old Main, at the University of Colorado Boulder in Boulder, Colorado

District of Columbia
Chesapeake and Potomac Telephone Company, Old Main Building, Washington, D.C.
Old Main, at The George Washington University in Washington, DC

Georgia

 Old Main (Agnes Scott College), at Agnes Scott College in Decatur, Georgia

Illinois

Old Main, Almira College, listed on the National Register of Historic Places listings in Bond County, Illinois, currently part of Greenville College
 Old Main, Augustana College, constructed from 1884–1893, listed on the National Register of Historic Places in Illinois
 Old Main (Eastern Illinois University), one of the castle-like structures built on several Illinois universities during and after the administration of Governor John Peter Altgeld
 Old Main at Illinois State University, opened 1860, top story removed ca. 1940, remainder of building demolished in 1958; the bell, dating to 1882, is displayed on the campus quadrangle
 Old Main (Knox College), the only existing site of the 1858 senatorial debates between Abraham Lincoln and Stephen Douglas, in Illinois
 Hauptgebaude, commonly known as Old Main, at Elmhurst College
 Old Main, North Central College, completed in 1870, with a fourth floor in the central part of the building added in 1998
 Old Main (North Park University), built by North Park University in 1894 in North Park, Chicago and listed on the National Register of Historic Places listing in North Side Chicago

Indiana

 Old Main (Franklin College), Franklin College (Indiana), Franklin, Indiana

Iowa

Old Main (Drake University), administrative building on the campus of Drake University in Des Moines
Old Main (Grand View University) on the campus of Grand View University in Des Moines, listed on the National Register of Historic Places in Polk County, Iowa.
Old Main (Iowa Wesleyan University), listed on the National Register of Historic Places in Henry County, Iowa
Old Main (Wartburg College), listed on the National Register of Historic Places in Bremer County, Iowa

Maryland
Old Main at Frostburg State University built in 1902

Michigan
 Old Main at Alma College, built in 1886, it was the main administration and academic building for Alma College students until it was destroyed by fire on March 10, 1969.
 Old Main at Central Michigan University, built in 1893, it served as the original administration building of CMU before being destroyed by fire in 1925.
 Old Main, Suomi College, the first building on the campus of Suomi College (now Finlandia University) in Hancock, Michigan. The building is listed on the National Register of Historic Places.
 Old Main (Wayne State University), a historical building on the campus of Wayne State University, which originally housed the Detroit Central High School, in Michigan. The building is listed on the National Register of Historic Places.

Minnesota

 Old Main (Augsburg University), built in 1901 and originally known as "New Main", on the campus of Augsburg University in Minneapolis, Minnesota
 Old Main (Hamline University), built in 1884 after a fire destroyed the original University Hall in 1883

 Old Main, Martin Luther College, built in 1884
 Old Main, St. Olaf College, built in 1877
 Old Main, Macalester College, built in 1888

Mississippi

 Old Main (Mississippi State University), historic dormitory on the campus of Mississippi State University destroyed by fire in 1959

Nebraska

 Old Main (Nebraska Wesleyan University), historic building on the campus of Nebraska Wesleyan University, Lincoln, Nebraska

New York

 Old Main (SUNY New Paltz), the first building on the campus of the State University of New York at New Paltz.
 Old Main (Vassar College), a National Historic Landmark building on the campus of Vassar College in Poughkeepsie, New York
 Old Main Mental Asylum, in Utica, New York, now closed

North Carolina

 Old Main, erected in 1923 and the oldest building on the campus of the University of North Carolina at Pembroke in Pembroke, North Carolina. The building is listed on the National Register of Historic Places.

North Dakota
Old Main (Minot State University), a building on the campus of Minot State University in Minot, North Dakota.
Old Main (Minot State University-Bottineau), a building on the campus of Minot State University-Bottineau in Bottineau, North Dakota.
Old Main (North Dakota State College of Science), a building on the campus of North Dakota State College of Science in Wahpeton, North Dakota
Old Main (North Dakota State University), a historic building on the campus of North Dakota State University in Fargo, North Dakota.

Ohio

Old Main at Case Western Reserve University building designed by Charles F. Schweinfurth
Old Main at Miami University stood from 1818 to 1958 and was replaced by the current Harrison Hall (Miami University).  Beta Theta Pi and Phi Kappa Tau fraternities were founded in Old Main in 1839 and 1906, respectively.
Old Main at the University of Findlay, built in 1888 and tower lowered due to stability issues in 1912.

Pennsylvania
 Old Main (IUP) John Sutton Hall, the heart of Indiana University of Pennsylvania's historic area called The Oak Grove and registered in the National Register of Historic Places.
 Old Main (Slippery Rock University of Pennsylvania), on the campus of Slippery Rock University of Pennsylvania.
 Old Main (Mansfield University of Pennsylvania), a building on Mansfield University of Pennsylvania campus.
 Old Main (Bloomsburg University of Pennsylvania), a building on the campus of Bloomsburg University of Pennsylvania.
 Old Main (Shippensburg University of Pennsylvania), the first building on the campus of Shippensburg University of Pennsylvania
Old Main (The Kiski School), a building on the campus of The Kiski School, Saltsburg
 Old Main (California University of Pennsylvania), a building on the campus of California University of Pennsylvania
 Old Main (Pennsylvania State University), a building on the campus of Pennsylvania State University
 Old Main (Washington & Jefferson College), a building on the campus of Washington & Jefferson College
 Old Main (Geneva College), the first building on the campus of Geneva College in Beaver Falls, Pennsylvania
 Old Main (Widener University), a building on the campus of Widener University, Chester, PA
Old Main (Franklin & Marshall College), Franklin & Marshall College
Old Main (Westminster College), a building on the campus of Westminster College (Pennsylvania)
Old Main (Kutztown University), a building on the campus of Kutztown University of Pennsylvania

South Dakota

 Old Main (University of South Dakota), a building on the campus of University of South Dakota

Texas

 Old Main (Baylor University), the first building on the campus of Baylor University in Waco
 Old Main (Sam Houston State University), historic building on the campus of Sam Houston State University in Huntsville built in 1889
 Old Main (Texas State University), the first building built on the campus of Texas State University in San Marcos
 Old Main (Texas Woman's University), the first building on the campus of Texas Woman's University in Denton, opened in 1903
 Old Main (The University of Texas at Austin), the first permanent building on the campus of the University of Texas at Austin in Austin

Utah

 Old Main (Southern Utah University), a historic building completed in 1898 on the campus of what is now Southern Utah University in Cedar City, Utah
 Old Main (Utah State University), a building on the campus of Utah State University in Logan, Utah

Washington

 Old Main (Western Washington University), a building on the campus of Western Washington University in Bellingham.
 Old Main (Pacific Lutheran University), a building on the campus of Pacific Lutheran University in Tacoma, currently serving as a residence hall and known more commonly as Harstad Hall.

West Virginia
Old Main (Alderson-Broaddus College) (1909), burned in 1978; replaced by "New Main Hall"
Old Main (Nicholas County High School), listed on the NRHP in West Virginia
Old Main (Bethany College), a National Historic Landmark building on the Bethany College campus in West Virginia.
Old Main (Marshall University) the oldest building still standing on the Marshall University campus in Huntington, West Virginia.

Wisconsin
Old Main (University of Wisconsin Stevens Point)
Old Main (Lakeland University)

Wyoming

 Old Main (University of Wyoming), the first building built on the campus of University of Wyoming, in Laramie, Wyoming.

See also
Main Hall (disambiguation), also used similarly for main buildings of universities
Administration Building (disambiguation), also used similarly

References